Dry or dryness most often refers to:

 Lack of rainfall, which may refer to
Arid regions
Drought
 Dry or dry area, relating to legal prohibition of selling, serving, or imbibing alcoholic beverages
 Dry humor, deadpan
 Dryness (medical)
 Dryness (taste), the lack of sugar in a drink, especially an alcoholic one
 Dry direct sound without reverberation

Dry or DRY may also refer to:

Places
 Dry Brook (disambiguation), various rivers
 Dry Creek (disambiguation), various rivers and towns
 Dry, Loiret, a commune of the Loiret département in France
 Dry River (disambiguation), various rivers and towns

Art, entertainment, and media

Film
 Dry (2014 film), a Nigerian film directed by Stephanie Linus
 Dry (2022 film), an Italian film directed by Paolo Virzì
 The Dry (film), a 2020 film based on the novel by Jane Harper

Literature
 Dry (memoir), a 2003 memoir by Augusten Burroughs
 The Dry (novel), a 2016 novel by Jane Harper

Music
 Dry (group), a Cantopop music duo
 Dry (album), by PJ Harvey, 1992
 "Dry", a song by PJ Harvey from the 1993 album Rid of Me
 "Dry" (song), by Rancid Eddie, 2021
 "Dry", a song by Kutless from their self-titled album
 "Dry", a song by Welsh band Feeder from the 1999 album Yesterday Went Too Soon

Television
 The Dry (TV series), an Irish TV series

Organizations
 Asociación Democracia Real Ya
 Plataforma ¡Democracia Real YA!
 Wets and dries, a faction in the British Conservative Party

Technology and computing
 Don't repeat yourself (DRY), a software development principle
 Dry cell, a type of battery

Other uses
Dry (surname), a surname
Dry (rapper) (born 1977), real name Landry Delica, rapper of Congolese origin

See also
 

fr:Sec